The Realm Online, originally known as The Realm, is a massively multiplayer online role playing game (MMORPG) launched in December 1996 for Windows PC. It was designed in the tradition of graphical MUDs, before the usage of the terms "massively multiplayer" and "MMORPG".

Originally published by Sierra On-Line, it was abandoned by that company because of its unfavorable comparison to Ultima Online and EverQuest. It was next taken up for a short time by a company called World Opponent Network which was also owned by Sierra On-line, then Codemasters, and presently is a Norseman Games production.

In April 2018 Norseman Games of Michigan, LLC granted an exclusive license to Rat Labs, LLC to develop and distribute The Realm. Later in June 1, Rat Labs opened a "fresh start" server that is free to play.

Gameplay 
The Realm Online uses turn-based combat, which makes it different from other MUDs of its generation, and is convenient for players with a bad Internet connection. it has been credited to be the first virtual world to use instances, with every battle taking place in a special room outside of the open world.

The game has been criticized for its unforgiving character creation: a character that hasn't been created optimally can't reach maximum potential.

Popularity 
In the game's first year, 25,000 user accounts had been made. In 2008, the server would still reach an online population of 100 to 200 players during peak hours and has since returned to these numbers with the release of the free to play version of the server.

References

External links 
 

Instanced massively multiplayer online role-playing games
1996 video games
Graphical MUDs
Video games developed in the United States
Video games scored by Chance Thomas
Windows games
Windows-only games